Yayuk Basuki and Caroline Vis were the defending champions but lost in the first round to Chanda Rubin and Irina Spîrlea.

Martina Hingis and Natasha Zvereva won in the final 6–4, 6–2 against Tamarine Tanasugarn and Elena Tatarkova.

Seeds
Champion seeds are indicated in bold text while text in italics indicates the round in which those seeds were eliminated.

 Martina Hingis /  Natasha Zvereva (champions)
 Alexandra Fusai /  Nathalie Tauziat (first round)
 Yayuk Basuki /  Caroline Vis (first round)
 Arantxa Sánchez-Vicario /  Patricia Tarabini (quarterfinals)

Draw

External links
 1998 Acura Classic Doubles Draw

LA Women's Tennis Championships
1998 WTA Tour